Aaron Joel Brown (born 1980) is an Australian-American violinist, composer and teacher, specializing in Early Music. He is a founder of the trio, Guido's Ear. Brown became a member of the Australian Brandenburg Orchestra in 2009. He has worked with American early music groups, Early Music New York, Opera Lafayette and the New York Collegium.

Brown studied music at the Juilliard School, the Mannes School of Music and Hunter College. His teachers were Dorothy Delay and Lewis Kaplan.

Discography 
Solo records:
 Aaron Brown - Baroque Violin (2008)
 Early Modern (2016)

With the Australian Brandenburg Orchestra:
 Tapas Taste of the Baroque (2010)
 Brandenburg Celebrates (2015)

References

External links 

 

1980 births
Living people
Australian violinists
21st-century American composers
Australian composers
American people of Australian descent
21st-century American violinists